Olga Evertovna Knorring (1887-1978)  was a botanist from the Soviet Union known for studying the plants of Central Asia.

References 

1887 births
1978 deaths
Soviet botanists